Vladimir Mikhaylovich Petrov (15 February 1907 – 14 June 1991) was a member of the Soviet Union's clandestine services who became famous in 1954 for his defection to Australia.

Biography

Early life
He was born Afanasy Mikhaylovich Shorokhov, into a peasant family in the village of Larikha, in central Siberia.

Petrov joined the Komsomol in 1923 and the Soviet Navy., changing his full name to Vladimir Mikhaylovich Proletarsky.

Intelligence career 
According to his recently released secret British MI5 file, Petrov stated during his post-defection interviewing that his intelligence career was as follows:
 1929–1933 cypher clerk Soviet Navy.
 1933–1938 NKVD Moscow dealing with overseas cypher communications.
 1939 NKVD cypher clerk attached to Soviet Army Western China.
 1940–1942 NKVD cypher clerk Moscow dealing with Internal communications.
 1942–1947 NKVD cypher clerk Sweden with additional Internal Security duties.
 1947–1951 MGB Moscow dealing with seamen on the Danube.
 1951–1954 MGB controller in Australia.

Petrov also gave information about the defection of Burgess and Maclean of the Cambridge Five. Their escape had been handled by Kislitsyn, an MGB officer who was in Australia when Petrov defected in 1954. Petrov also disclosed that Burgess and Maclean were living in Kuibyshev in 1954. (National Archives Reference:kv/2/3440)

Joining OGPU
He decided to join the Soviet spy organization, the OGPU, in May 1933.  He was subsequently admitted to the Special Cipher Section, which was attached to the Foreign Department of the OGPU.  It was his status in this section which allowed him to learn many Soviet secrets by reading the top secret ciphers.

Petrov lived through the purges of Stalin under Yagoda, Yezhov, and Beria.  Even though a great number of his friends, colleagues, and superiors were arrested and executed, Petrov escaped unscathed.

Australia and defection

Having graduated from cipher clerk to full-fledged agent, Petrov was sent to Australia by the Russian Ministry of Internal Affairs (MVD) in 1951. His job there was to recruit spies and to keep watch on Soviet citizens, making sure that none of the Soviets abroad defected. Ironically, it was in Australia where events would occur which led to his own defection from the USSR. This came about through his association with Polish-born doctor and musician Michael Bialoguski, who played along in seeming to allow Petrov to recruit him to gather information, while at the same time reporting to Australian Security Intelligence Organisation on Petrov's activities.

Petrov applied for political asylum in 1954, on the grounds that he could provide information regarding a Soviet spy ring operating out of the Soviet Embassy in Australia. Petrov states in his memoirs (ghost written by Michael Thwaites) that his reasoning for defecting lay not in an imminent fear of being executed, but in his disillusionment with the Soviet system and his own experiences and knowledge of the terror and human suffering inflicted on the Soviet people by their government. He witnessed the destruction of the Siberian village in which he was born, caused by forced collectivization and the famine which resulted.

Life after defection
Vladimir Petrov became an Australian citizen in 1956. The Petrovs bought a home in Bentleigh, Melbourne, in  the same year. He and his wife Evdokia's names were changed to Sven and Anna Allyson to protect their identities. They lived a quiet suburban life in Melbourne.  He died in 1991, and she died in 2002.

They were protected under the D-notice system. Although the press agreed not to identify them under the D-notice, the press did not always observe this voluntary protection order. The whereabouts of the Petrovs were still the subject of a D-Notice in 1982.

Fictional representations
Petrov's defection has inspired a number of fictional works.

 The Red Shoe, a novel by Ursula Dubosarsky which won the New South Wales Premier's Literary Award and the Queensland Premier's Literary Award in 2006.
 Mrs Petrov's Shoe, a play by Noelle Janaczewska which won the Queensland Premier's Literary Award for drama in 2006.
 The Safe House, an animation by Lee Whitmore, narrated by Noni Hazelhurst, which won Best Animation at the Sydney Film Festival 2006.
 Document Z, a novel by Andrew Croome, which won the Australian/Vogel Literary Award in 2008.
 The Petrov Affair, a 1987 television mini-series.

See also
 Australian Labor Party split of 1955
 List of Eastern Bloc defectors

References

Further reading 

1907 births
1991 deaths
Australia–Soviet Union relations
Soviet emigrants to Australia
KGB officers
Soviet intelligence personnel who defected to the West
Soviet diplomats
Soviet spies
People sentenced to death in absentia by the Soviet Union